Arun Jain (born 30 December 1959) is a Chennai-based Indian industrialist, investor, and philanthropist. He is the chairman and managing director of Intellect Design Arena Limited, an IT software products company in the banking, financial services, and insurance space, which is listed on the National Stock Exchange as Intellect. He was also the founder, Chairman, and CEO of Polaris Consulting and Services Ltd. (formerly known as Polaris Software Labs), an IT services company. On 4 March 2016, Virtusa Corporation acquired a majority stake in Polaris Consulting & Services Limited.

Arun has also been appointed the Chief Mentor of the Centre of Excellence for FinTech set up by the Ministry of Electronics & Information Technology (MeitY), Govt. of India, Member of the National Software Product Mission, a strategic forum for the implementation of National Policy on Software Products 2019 constituted by MeitY. He is a Governing Council Member of STPI and also a Member of the Advisory Council of TechNest, an incubation facility provided by STPI-Chennai.  He has held and continues to hold, positions in CII, MMA, National Institute of Electronics and Information Technology (NIELIT), and the Indo-American Chamber of Commerce.

Career 
After his graduation, Arun interned with Wang Laboratories.

After his internship, Arun, along with some friends, started International Information Systems (IIS) in 1983 as a partnership firm. In 1986, IIS was renamed Nucleus Software Workshop Pvt. Ltd. At a professional level, his first major enterprise was the establishment of the Nucleus Software Workshop in 1986.

In 1993, he founded Polaris Software Lab with an initial capital of $250, which recorded a CAGR of over 100% during the seven-year period 1993–2000. Intellect Design Arena Ltd. is his fourth venture.

Personal life 
Arun was born in a middle-class family of nine siblings (eight sisters and an elder brother). His father was an Accounts officer in the Govt. of India's Postal & Telegraph (P&T) department. He completed his bachelor's degree in Electrical Engineering from Delhi College of Engineering (now known as Delhi Technological University).

Ullas Trust: Encouraging Academic Excellence 
Ullas Trust was started in 1997 by Arun Jain with an aim to integrate associates of Polaris, and later Intellect, with the larger community and enable them to enjoy the satisfaction of working with young minds in the country. Trust is a joint initiative of the employees and the organization.

Awards and recognition 

 Lifetime Achievement Award by the Confederation of Indian Industry (CII) at India's premier ICT Event, Connect 2016.
 Visionary of India 2014–15 Award, at the Brand Vision India 2020 Summit & Awards. 
 Indo-ASEAN Business Initiative Award 2008 from the then Indian High Commissioner and currently India's External Affairs Minister, Dr. S. Jaishankar, at the ’Zak Salaam India’ expo in Singapore.  
 ICICI Venture-CII Connect 2006 Awards along with Mr. Shiv Nadar, founder of HCL Technologies and Mr. Kumar Mahadeva, founder of Cognizant Technology Systems. 
 Business Mentor Award 2019 – Vikatan Group.
 Dronacharya Award – TiECON Chennai –  2019. 
 For the Sake of Honour Award – by Rotary –  2019. 
 Lifetime Achievement Award at the 4th edition of the Design Thinking Conclave & Awards 2018.

References/Notes and references

External links
Intellect Design Arena
Ullas Trust

1959 births
Living people
Delhi Technological University alumni
Indian industrialists
Indian investors
Indian philanthropists
Businesspeople in software
Indian Wikimedians
Chennai